Fuhlendorf is a municipality in the district of Segeberg, in Schleswig-Holstein, Germany. Its airfield is home to one of the five German Federal Police helicopter squadrons.

References

Municipalities in Schleswig-Holstein
Segeberg